The Classical Theatre of Harlem (CTH) is an off-broadway professional theatre company founded in 1999 at the Harlem School for the Arts. Producing on average 2-3 productions a year as well as implementing extensive educational programming, CTH remains the only year round theatre company operating on an Actor's Equity Association LORT contract in Harlem. Its season selections present a world repertory ranging from Euripides to Derek Walcott, featuring classical and new emerging playwrights. Since its founding, CTH has put on over 40+ productions, which have received numerous AUDELCO, OBIE, Drama Desk, American Theatre Wing and Lucille Lortel nominations and awards.

The Classical Theatre of Harlem is a 501(c)3 not-for-profit corporation that is purposeful in creating employment and educational opportunities for people of color and other marginalized groups in the field of the theatrical arts. This includes actors, directors, designers, writers, and administrators. To insure impact, CTH emphasizes diversity in casts and institutional leadership. CTH features people of color in canonical roles, as well as positions of authority where they have not traditionally been considered. By centering diversity, they attract distinctively diverse audiences, who see comprehensive reflections of themselves.

Mission 
The Classical Theatre of Harlem's mission is as follows:

"To maintain a professional theatre company dedicated to presenting the classics on the stages of Harlem; To create employment and educational outreach opportunities in the theatre arts for the Harlem community; To create and nurture a new, young, and culturally diverse audience for the “classics”; and to heighten the awareness of theater and of great art in Harlem.

"The distinguishing characteristic of the Classical Theatre of Harlem (CTH) is defined by their value proposition: The Classical Theatre of Harlem creates entertaining, emotionally engaging and intellectually rigorous theatre that is anchored in the context of the African Diaspora. Through their programming, CTH benefits 18,000 New Yorkers annually with a strong presence and influence in Harlem."

History 
The Classical Theatre of Harlem was founded in 1999 by theatre directors Alfred Preisser and Christopher McElroen at The Harlem School of the Arts where Alfred served as the director of the Theatre Division until 2007. Both men directed the majority of shows produced at The Classical Theatre of Harlem during their time of leadership with the exception of Funnyhouse of a Negro, directed by  Billie Allen, and Ma Rainey s Black Bottom, directed by Arthur French. Preisser served as artistic director and McElroen as executive director for ten years before simultaneously stepping down in early November 2009. Towards the end of their management, the company struggled significantly due to financial mismanagement and neared bankruptcy. 

Ty Jones worked at The Classical Theatre of Harlem as an actor and artistic collaborator since 2003 before taking over as Producing Artistic Director. In 2009, CTH was nearly closed due to many events: the downturn in the economy, the dramatic cuts in funding for the arts, and the abrupt but necessary departure of the founders. Led by Jones, CTH’s board answered these circumstances, which included retiring $400,000 of debt, with an unprecedented artistic and administrative comeback.  Jones maintained the company’s relevance through "Future Classics" - a series of readings of new plays by emerging playwrights of color, as well as readings of classic plays. He also established "Project Classics", an arts education program for youth in Grant and Manhattanville housing in partnership with the New York City Housing Authority (NYCHA).  Mr. Jones then found vital funding enabling strategic partnerships to reintroduce full productions. These included the Uptown Meets Downtown™ partnership with downtown theater companies and the inaugural Uptown Shakespeare in the Park (USP) at the Richard Rodgers Amphitheater in Marcus Garvey Park.  
 
Administratively, CTH created a turnaround plan to address organizational growth.  This plan was presented to the Upper Manhattan Empowerment Zone (UMEZ) and became the basis for a 30 month $312,000 capacity building grant that allowed CTH to professionalize its operations.

CTH is distinct in that many of their productions and programs are provided for free or minimal cost to patrons. For example, their annual USP production, which attracts roughly 12,000 people each summer, is free, unticketed, family-friendly and ADA compliant.  By bringing USP to a vastly underutilized public space, (the Richard Rodgers Amphitheatre) it has been an instrumental force in raising the Park's reputation as a safe, cultural destination to be shared by all: rich and poor, young and old, local Harlemites and visitors. As such, CTH removes barriers to entry (cost, travel, wait-times, lotteries) for guests. In the winter, they feature a family-friendly holiday show, designed to become an annual Harlem tradition. Spring has historically been reserved for newer, experimental productions that appeal to theater enthusiasts, who favor thought-provoking stories and narratives of current social issues. CTH is the only professional theatre company above 96th Street dedicated to the classical canon, revivals, new works and musicals. CTH is well respected among its peers in Black theatre, often cited for its artistic and institutional excellence celebrating the work and talents of diverse theatre-makers at the performance and production level.

In 2018, CTH partnered with Columbia University School of the Arts MFA Theatre Program in an educational program featuring Columbia's MFA third-year actors and stage managers. These students form "The Young Company" whose charge is to provide productions to middle and high school students. In 2021, in the wake of the pandemic, The Classical Theatre of Harlem was the first company to open live outdoor theater in New York City, with the NY Times Critic's Pick production of "Seize the King", directed by Associate Artistic Director of CTH and Chair of the NYU Graduate Acting, Carl Cofield.

Additional Programming 
Since 2009, CTH’s core education program "Project Classics" has been designed to provide in-school and after-school subsidized theatre workshops to schools or Community Benefit Organizations (CBO).  It aims to develop confident, creative young leaders by introducing them to the rigors of artistic practice. This multifaceted program brings productive, positive paths to the forefront, encourages students to expand their ideas of social responsibility, enhances cultural literacy, and develops life skills that go beyond the artistic field.

"Playwrights' Playground" is a program where 4 to 5 playwrights are selected to bring in 10-15 pages of new work. Each play is cast on the spot, receives a cold reading, and a moderated feedback session.

"Future Classics" are readings of full plays with professional actors and a short rehearsal period. The writers also receives a moderated feedback session. CTH asserts that a future classic is a play of social significance. It enlightens us on issues economic, political, and cultural.

"Revisited Classics" are readings that take a new look at the work of classic playwrights.

Production History

Awards and nominations 
The Classical Theatre of Harlem holds 61 AUDELCO nominations  and has won 18 awards for excellence in Black theatre. Many of their other accomplishments include:

 2 Lucille Lortel Awards
 5 OBIE Awards
 Drama Desk Award for Artistic Excellence 2004 Drama Desk nomination for Best Actress
 Drama Desk nomination for Outstanding Musical Revival
 Edwin Booth Award for Artistic Excellence
 American Theater Wing Ward
 CTH named "1 of 8 Theatres to Watch in America" by The Drama League

CTH received a National Endowment for the Arts Award for the development of Radha Blank's Seed.

References

External links
 Official website of the Classical Theatre of Harlem

Theatre companies in New York City
Obie Award recipients
1999 establishments in New York City
Arts organizations established in 1999
Harlem